Clavulina ornatipes is a species of coral fungus in the family Clavulinaceae. First described as Clavaria ornatipes by Charles Horton Peck in 1908, it was transferred to Clavulina by E.J.H. Corner in 1950.

References

External links

Fungi described in 1908
Fungi of North America
ornatipes